The Taractrocerini , the orange grass skippers are a tribe in the Hesperiinae subfamily of skipper butterflies.

Genera
Arrhenes
Banta
Cephrenes
Kobrona
Mimene
Ocybadistes
Oriens
Pastria
Potanthus
Taractrocera
Telicota
Sabera
Suniana

 
Butterfly tribes